Bretagne may refer to:

Places
Brittany, the historic province in northwestern France called Bretagne in French
Brittany (administrative region), the present-day French region, also called in French Bretagne, smaller than the historic province
Bretagne, Indre, a French village in the Indre department
Bretagne, Territoire de Belfort, a French village in the Territoire de Belfort department
Bretagne-d'Armagnac, a commune in the Gers department
Bretagne-de-Marsan, a commune in the Landes department
Dol-de-Bretagne, a commune in the Ille-et-Vilaine department

Ships
French ship Bretagne (1766), a large 110-gun French ship of the line
French ship Bretagne (1855), a fast 130-gun warship of the French Navy
French battleship Bretagne (1913), the first Bretagne-class battleship of the French Navy 
SS La Bretagne, an ocean liner of the Compagnie Générale Transatlantique in service from 1886 to 1912
SS Bretagne (1951), an ocean liner renamed SS Brittany in 1962
MV Bretagne (1989), a ferry-boat operated by Brittany Ferries
French submarine Saphir (S602) was originally ordered as Bretagne in 1979, but was renamed before commissioning in 1981.

Other
Operation Bretagne, a military operation between 1952 and 1953 of the First Indochina War
Sud-Ouest Bretagne, a French airliner of the 1940s
Tour Bretagne (or Brittany Tower), a skyscraper in Nantes
TER Bretagne, the regional rail network serving Brittany
Bleus de Bretagne (or Breton Blues), a liberal organization in Brittany
Bretagne (rescue dog), last surviving rescue dog of the 9/11 attacks

See also 
 Brittany (disambiguation)